Kim Dermott is a former association football player who represented New Zealand at international level.

Dermott made her Football Ferns début in a 0–3 loss to United States on 8 August 1993, and finished her international career with 11 caps and two goals to her credit.

Kim represented New Zealand in softball with the White sox and competed in 1994,1998,2002 World Series and Sydney 2000 Olympics.

References

Year of birth missing (living people)
Living people
New Zealand women's international footballers
New Zealand women's association footballers
New Zealand softball players
Softball players at the 2000 Summer Olympics
Olympic softball players of New Zealand

Women's association footballers not categorized by position